Andrew Ford (born 16 September 1970) is a former Australian rules footballer who played with Melbourne in the Australian Football League (AFL).

Ford was drafted from North Ballarat. Melbourne selected him with pick 55 in the 1988 National Draft. He played four games in each of his two seasons.

References

External links
 
 

1970 births
Australian rules footballers from Victoria (Australia)
Melbourne Football Club players
North Ballarat Football Club players
Living people